Kane Island is an island in Franz Josef Land, Arkhangelsk Oblast, Russian Arctic.

Geography 

The northeastern tip is called Cape Hellwald (Russian: мыс Гельвальда) while Cape Easter (Russian: мыс Пасхи) is in the southeast.

The island is located on the eastern side of the central Zichy Land group within Franz Josef Land. All three islands are separated from the larger Greely Island to the southwest by the Sternek Strait (Russian: пролив Штернека).

History 

The island was discovered by the Austro-Hungarian North Pole expedition. They first reached Cape Easter on 5 April 1874, Easter Sunday, during the second of Julius Payer's sledge journeys. On the return journey from their northward trip, Payer climbed Cape Hellwald on 17 April, where he ascertained that the land in question was an island. He named the island after American Arctic explorer Dr. Elisha Kent Kane. Cape Hellwald was named after Austrian journalist Friedrich von Hellwald who had written several articles about the expedition.

See also 
 Franz Josef Land
 List of islands of Russia

References

External links 
 Kane Island (Ostrov Keyna) - Franz Josef Land on www.franz-josef-land.info

Islands of Franz Josef Land
Uninhabited islands of Russia